Yoko Matsuoka McClain (January 1, 1924 – November 2, 2011) was a Japanese-born American professor of Japanese language and literature at the University of Oregon. She was the granddaughter of Japanese novelist, Natsume Sōseki, from her maternal lineage.

McClain was born Yoko Matsuoka in Tokyo. She graduated from Tsuda College in 1945 and found work as a translator during the Occupation of Japan by the Americans following World War II. She obtained a scholarship, the forebearer of the Fulbright Program, to study at the University of Oregon. As a student, Matsuoka worked as a receptionist for the University of Oregon's art museum, now called the Jordan Schnitzer Museum of Art. She received a bachelor's degree in French from the University of Oregon in 1956 and a master's degree in comparative literature in 1967.

McClain taught Japanese literature at the University of Oregon from 1964 to 1994, when she became a professor emeritus. She authored more than a dozen books and scholarly works on Japanese studies. Her husband, George Robert McClain, collected Japanese prints and art, which she donated to Jordan Schnitzer Museum of Art following his death.

The Japanese Minister of Foreign Affairs honored McClain for her contributions to Japanese-U.S. cultural relations in 2003. The University of Oregon College of Arts and Sciences also awarded her the Alumni Fellows Award in 2003. In August 2011, McClain received the Gertrude Bass Warner Award from the Jordan Schnitzer Museum of Art.

Yoko McClain died from a stroke on November 2, 2011, at the age of 87. She was survived by her son, Ken McClain; one grandchild; and her sister, Mariko Hando.

References

1924 births
2011 deaths
University of Oregon faculty
University of Oregon alumni
Japanese emigrants to the United States
People from Tokyo
Tsuda University alumni
Japanese literature academics
American academics of Japanese descent
20th-century American translators
20th-century American women writers
American women academics
21st-century American women